The Mrazig are a previously nomadic people who live in and around the town of Douz, Tunisia. Numbering around 50,000, they are the descendants of the Banu Sulaym tribe who left the Arabian peninsula in the eighth century. They lived first in Egypt, then Libya, and finally arrived and settled in Tunisia in the thirteenth century.

African nomads
Arabs in Tunisia
Ethnic groups in Tunisia